Nemaschema mulsanti is a species of beetle in the family Cerambycidae. It was described by Perroud in 1864.

References

Enicodini
Beetles described in 1864